Dhaandhoo (Dhivehi: ދާންދޫ) is one of the inhabited islands of Gaafu Alif Atoll in the Maldives.

Geography

Demography

References

External links
Secretariat of the Dhaandhoo Council

Islands of the Maldives